Cecilía Rán Rúnarsdóttir (born 26 July 2003) is an Icelandic professional footballer for who plays as a goalkeeper for Bayern Munich of the German Frauen-Bundesliga and the Icelandic national football team.

Early life
Cecilía started playing football around the age of 6 with Afturelding. At the age of 10, she started playing as a goalkeeper.

Club career
Cecilía started her senior career with Afturelding/Fram, a joint team off Afturelding and Knattspyrnufélagið Fram, in 2017 in the 2. deild kvenna where she helped the team finish first. In 2018, she played 13 matches in the second-tier Inkasso league and was named the league's Best Young Player by opposing coaches and team captains. After the season, in October 2018, she signed with Fylkir which had won promotion from the Inkasso league to the top-tier Úrvalsdeild kvenna. She had a great start with Fylkir in the beginning of the season, including an outstanding performance when Fylkir unexpectedly knocked out the reigning Cup holders, Breiðablik, in the Icelandic Cup. After the season she was named the best Young Player of the Year.

In March 2021, Cecilía signed with KIF Örebro for the 2021 season.

In August 2021, Cecilía signed a three-year contract with English club Everton and was immediately loaned back to KIF Örebro for the remainder of the 2021 Damallsvenskan season.

In January 2022, Cecilía joined German club FC Bayern Munich on loan until 30 June 2022. In July 2022, Bayern Munich announced that Cecilía had signed a 4-year contract with the club.

International career
In August 2019, Cecilía was selected to the Icelandic national team for the first time by head coach Jón Þór Hauksson ahead of its  UEFA Euro 2020 qualifying matches. On 4 March 2020, she started her first match in a 1–0 victory against Northern Ireland, becoming the youngest ever goalkeeper for Iceland and breaking Þóra Björg Helgadóttir's record by 148 days.

Honours
Afturelding/Fram
2. deild kvenna: 2017

Individual
 Úrvalsdeild Young Player of the Year: 2020

References

External links
 
 
 

2003 births
Living people
Cecilia Ran Runarsdottir
Cecilia Ran Runarsdottir
Cecilia Ran Runarsdottir
Women's association football goalkeepers
UEFA Women's Euro 2022 players